Dalayer or Dalair may refer to:
 Dalayer-e Olya
 Dalayer-e Sofla